Michael Wex (born September 12, 1954) is a Canadian novelist, playwright, translator, lecturer, performer, and author of books on language and literature. His specialty is Yiddish and his book Born to Kvetch was a surprise bestseller in 2005. Wex lives in Toronto with his wife Marilla and daughter Sabina.

Michael Wex was born in Lethbridge, Alberta, Canada to a family of descendants of Rebbes of Ciechanów and Stryków. He has taught at the University of Toronto and the University of Michigan.

Works
The Frumkiss Family Business. Toronto: Knopf Canada, 2010. 
How to Be a Mentsh (and Not a Shmuck). Harper, 2009. 
Just Say Nu: Yiddish for Every Occasion (When English Just Won't Do). New York: St. Martin's Press, 2007. 
Born to Kvetch: Yiddish Language And Culture in All Its Moods. Publisher: St. Martin's Press (September 1, 2005). 
Born to Kvetch (Audio CD). 
Shlepping the Exile, 1993, 
The Adventures of Micah Mushmelon, Boy Talmudist. 2007.
Die Abenteuer des Micah Mushmelon, kindlicher Talmudist (dt. von Heiko Lehmann, Wagenbach 2005)
Classic Yiddish Stories of S.Y. Abramovitsh, Sholem Aleichem, and I.L. Peretz. (Michael Wex, translator) 2004. 
The Wishing-Ring by S.Y. Abramovitsh (Michael Wex, translator). 2003. 
God in Paris (performance)
Sex in Yiddish (performance)
Judenverwolkung, or Meshiekh's Tsaytn (performance)
I Just Want to Jewify (The Yiddish Revenge on Wagner) (performance)
Rhapsody in Schmaltz: Yiddish Food and Why We Can't Stop Eating It

References

External links
Michael Wex's website

KlezKamp: The Yiddish Folk Arts Program

1954 births
Living people
Jewish Canadian writers
Canadian people of Polish-Jewish descent
Canadian male novelists
20th-century Canadian dramatists and playwrights
21st-century Canadian dramatists and playwrights
Linguists of Yiddish
Academic staff of the University of Toronto
University of Michigan faculty
Writers from Lethbridge
University of Massachusetts Amherst faculty
Canadian male dramatists and playwrights
20th-century Canadian male writers
21st-century Canadian male writers